Tomahawk Spring is a historic spring house located near Martinsburg, at Tomahawk, Berkeley County, West Virginia. It was built about 1860 on the stone foundation of a previous building. It is a one-story, wood-frame structure atop a three-feet-tall stone foundation in two sections.

It was listed on the National Register of Historic Places in 1994.

References

Agricultural buildings and structures on the National Register of Historic Places in West Virginia
Houses completed in 1860
Buildings and structures in Berkeley County, West Virginia
National Register of Historic Places in Berkeley County, West Virginia
Spring houses